Kosta Rodrigues (born 12 August 1979 in Rüsselsheim) is a retired German footballer who last played professionally for 1. FC Magdeburg. Before joining Magdeburg he spent most of his career with Eintracht Braunschweig, including two seasons in the 2. Bundesliga.

After retiring from professional football, Rodrigues became a youth coach at Eintracht Braunschweig.

References

External links

1979 births
Living people
People from Rüsselsheim
Sportspeople from Darmstadt (region)
Footballers from Hesse
German footballers
Eintracht Braunschweig players
Eintracht Braunschweig II players
1. FC Saarbrücken players
1. FC Magdeburg players
Wuppertaler SV players
Association football midfielders
2. Bundesliga players
3. Liga players
Eintracht Braunschweig non-playing staff

German people of Portuguese descent